The 7th Lagos State House of Assembly was the legislative branch of the Lagos State Government inaugurated on 4 June 2011.
The assembly ran its course till 3 June 2015.
The assembly is unicameral with 40 representatives elected from each constituencies of the state.
The Speaker of the 7th Legislative Assembly was Rt. Hon Adeyemi Ikuforiji and the Deputy speaker was Hon. Musibau Kolawole Taiwo.
The election of representative for the 8th legislative assembly was held on 28 April 2015.

Powers and duties
The legislative function of the Assembly is to make law by passing bills, which must be endorsed by the two-thirds majority of the house.
Following the endorsement by the two-thirds majority, the bill is presented to the Governor, who will sign the bill to become law.
The assembly assess and approve the annual budget of the state government on presentation by the governor.
The assembly also play a significant role in the appointment of the state commissioners, Chief judges and other top official by the governor.

References

2011 establishments in Nigeria
State lower houses in Nigeria